Hollywood Showdown is an American game show that aired on both PAX TV and Game Show Network from January to June 2000, then returned solely to GSN on January 1, 2001 and ran until March 30 of that year. Reruns aired on GSN again from September 2004 to April 2005 plus June 2006 and June 2007 on TV Guide Network. Todd Newton served as host, with Randy West announcing.

The show was one of GSN's most popular shows at the time of its airing.

Format
Seven contestants competed against each other over the course of five episodes (ranging Monday through Friday), competing to answer trivia questions pertaining to the entertainment industry. At any given time, one contestant was in control of the game, while the other six stood to the side, each holding an envelope. Five of the envelopes held cards with dollar amounts ranging from $100 to $1,000 in $10 increments, while the last had the "Box Office" card.

The contestant in control selected one gallery member, who opened his/her envelope and revealed its contents. The two contestants then faced each other in a question round. Todd Newton read a series of toss-up questions with three answer choices, open for either contestant to buzz in. A correct answer scored one point, while a miss gave the opponent a chance to respond and steal the point. The first contestant to score three points took control, while the opponent had to sit out the remainder of the game.

If the gallery member's card showed a dollar amount, it was added to the Box Office jackpot, which began at $10,000 for the start of each Monday episode and was reset to this value after being collected. If the gallery member had the "Box Office" card, the winner of that question round played for the jackpot.

Box Office
The object of the Box Office round was to answer five open-ended questions correctly. Before each question, the contestant was presented with two category choices. The first four correct answers were worth $500 each, and the fifth won the Box Office.

After any correct answer, the contestant could either end the round and keep all money won to that point, or continue to the next question. An incorrect response at any time ended the round and forfeited the accumulated money. If the contestant did not win the Box Office through either a miss or a decision to stop, a new game began and he/she had initial control, with the Box Office continuing to grow from its previous value. Any contestant who won the Box Office immediately retired from the show, and a new one was introduced to replace him/her; the Box Office was then reset to $10,000 for the next game.

Friday Payoff
All weeks were self-contained, meaning that a game in progress on Friday could not continue into the following Monday. When time ran out, all remaining gallery members opened their envelopes, and the one holding the Box Office card competed in the final question round for that week. The winner of that round could either accept $1,000 and leave the show, or return next week to play again for a brand-new $10,000 Box Office. Early in the first season, the winner of the last Friday showdown played the Box Office one last time.

Box Office Bonanza
A special "Box Office Bonanza Week" aired during the show's first season in May 2000, during which the "Box Office" card was replaced in some games by the "Blockbuster" card. When it was found, the winner of that question round played for a doubled Box Office jackpot; however, the prize returned to its original value if it was not won. On the Wednesday show of that week, a record $33,260 jackpot was won. The Friday payoff rules remained, except that the winner of the final question round was offered $2,000 to leave the show.

References

External links
 Official Website (PAX era)
 

Game Show Network original programming
PAX TV original programming
2000s American game shows
2000 American television series debuts
2001 American television series endings
English-language television shows